Mazirot is a commune in the Vosges department in Grand Est in northeastern France.

Inhabitants are called Mazuriens.

Geography
Mazirot is positioned between Épinal and Neufchâteau, a couple of kilometres to the north-east of Mirecourt in the valley of the River Madon which itself at one point provides the frontier with the commune of Poussay to the west.

The drive down towards Mirecourt offers a superb panorama of that town.  Meanwhile, on its western side, the entrance to Mazirot is marked by the residence of the local landlord.  From here a bridge spanning the Madon leads to the slopes on the river's right bank where the village has grown up.

See also
Communes of the Vosges department

References

Communes of Vosges (department)